The Mexicaneros are an indigenous people of Durango and Nayarit, Mexico. They are one of the 62 original cultures of Mexico. They speak the Mexicanero language, one of the Nahuatl dialects. Some 1,300 individuals spoke the Mexicanero language as of 2011.  They live in Mezquital Municipality, Durango (settlements of Agua Caliente, Agua Fría, Bancos de Calitique, Berenjén (Tepetates II), Combustita, Curachitos (Buena Vista), Chalatita, Chalchihuites, El Catorce, El Durazno (Duraznitos), El Rincón, El Toro, Escalera, Guajolote, Huazamotita, La Cañada, La Estancia, La Guajolota, La Tinaja, Las Campanas, Las Cruces, Las Norias, Las Pilas, Llano de Jacalitos (Jacalitos), Los Alacranes, Los Arquitos, Los Charcos, Los Crucitos, Los Espejos, Los Gavilanes, Los Leones, Mesa de los Lobos (Lobitos), Metatita, Nuevo León, Pino Real, San Antonio de Padua, San Bernabé, San Buenaventura, San Diego, San Francisco del Mezquital (El Mezquital), San Pedro Xícoras [San Pedro Jícoras], Santa María de Ocotán, Techalote (Buenavista), Tepalcates, Tortillas, and Yerbaniz) and Acaponeta (settlements of Acaponeta, Agua Tendida, Buenavista (Las Paredes), El Duraznito, El Naranjo, El Resbalón, Huanacaxtle, La Guásima, La Laguna (La Lagunita), La Paloma Nueva Reforma, Mesa las Arpas, Paredes, Rancho los López, Rancho de Ernesto Aguilar, San Diego de Alcalá, San Diego el Naranjo, San Dieguito de Abajo, San José de Gracia, Santa Cruz, Saycota, Sayulilla, Unidad Habitacional, and Zacatecas) and El Nayar (settlements of Dolores, Los Chapiles, Santa Teresa, and Tierras Cuevas) municipalities in Nayarit.

References

Indigenous peoples in Mexico